Ru Guang (born 1 November 1955) is a Chinese archer. He competed in the men's individual and team events at the 1988 Summer Olympics.

References

1955 births
Living people
Chinese male archers
Olympic archers of China
Archers at the 1988 Summer Olympics
Place of birth missing (living people)
Asian Games medalists in archery
Archers at the 1982 Asian Games
Archers at the 1986 Asian Games
Asian Games bronze medalists for China
Medalists at the 1982 Asian Games
Medalists at the 1986 Asian Games
20th-century Chinese people